Elma Center is a hamlet and census-designated place (CDP) in the town of Elma in Erie County, New York, United States. As of the 2010 census, this community population was 2,571. It is part of the Buffalo–Niagara Falls Metropolitan Statistical Area.

Elma Center is located near the center of the town on Bowen Road.

Geography
Elma Center is located at  (42.832559, -78.633242).

Demographics

At the 2000 census there were 2,491 people, 967 households, and 731 families living in the community. The population density was 399.0 per square mile (154.1/km). There were 993 housing units at an average density of 159.1/sq mi (61.4/km).  The racial makeup of the CDP was 99.00% White, 0.04% African American, 0.36% Asian, 0.12% from other races, and 0.48% from two or more races. Hispanic or Latino of any race were 0.52%.

Of the 967 households 27.4% had children under the age of 18 living with them, 69.2% were married couples living together, 4.4% had a female householder with no husband present, and 24.4% were non-families. 21.7% of households were one person and 11.8% were one person aged 65 or older. The average household size was 2.58 and the average family size was 3.01.

The age distribution was 22.0% under the age of 18, 5.3% from 18 to 24, 24.6% from 25 to 44, 29.1% from 45 to 64, and 19.1% 65 or older. The median age was 44 years. For every 100 females, there were 95.2 males. For every 100 females age 18 and over, there were 93.5 males.

The median household income was $54,010 and the median family income  was $61,500. Males had a median income of $42,071 versus $30,037 for females. The per capita income for the CDP was $25,877. About 2.1% of families and 3.4% of the population were below the poverty line, including 7.1% of those under age 18 and 3.3% of those age 65 or over.

References

Hamlets in New York (state)
Census-designated places in New York (state)
Buffalo–Niagara Falls metropolitan area
Census-designated places in Erie County, New York
Hamlets in Erie County, New York